Nong may refer to:

Nong, Iran, a village in Hormozgan Province, Iran
Nong District, a district of Savannakhet Province, Laos
The Nung people of Vietnam, or the Nong 农 branch of the Zhuang people of Wenshan Zhuang and Miao Autonomous Prefecture, Yunnan, China

Surname
Nong (surname), Chinese surname (農 / 农)
Nông Văn Vân (died 1835), Nung man who led a peasant revolt in Vietnam
Nông Thị Xuân (1932–1957), mistress of Ho Chi Minh
Nông Đức Mạnh (born 1940), Vietnamese politician, former general secretary of the Communist Party of Vietnam
Aloys Nong (born 1983), Cameroonian footballer

See also
Nong, a place name element in Thai meaning wetland, natural pool or swamp

A Nong (c. 1005–1055), a Zhuang shamaness, matriarch and warrior